Moriah is a mountain identified in the Book of Genesis; believed in Judaism, Christianity and Islam to be associated with the sacrifice of Abraham's son.
It may also be the Temple Mount.

Moriah may also refer to:

Places
In Australia:
Moriah College, an independent, Modern Orthodox Jewish, co-educational, day school in Sydney

In Canada:
Mount Moriah, Newfoundland and Labrador

In Israel:
Moriah, a place name mentioned in the Bible

In the United States:
Moriah School, a Jewish day school in Englewood, New Jersey
Moriah, New York, a town in Essex County
Moriah Shock Incarceration Correctional Facility
Mount Moriah, Missouri, a town
Mount Moriah (Nevada), a mountain
Mount Moriah Wilderness
Carter-Moriah Range, in the White Mountains of New Hampshire
Mount Moriah (New Hampshire)
Middle Moriah Mountain
Shelburne Moriah Mountain
 Mount Moriah, Philadelphia, Pennsylvania, a neighborhood
 Mt. Moriah (SEPTA station), trolley stop
Mount Moriah Cemetery (Philadelphia)
Mount Moriah Cemetery (South Dakota), burial place of several Wild West figures in Deadwood
Mount Moriah Cemetery (Fairview, New Jersey)

In Wales:
Moriah, Ceredigion, a hamlet in Ceredigion
Moriah, an electoral ward of Caerphilly County Borough Council
The Moriah Chapel, in Loughor, associated historically with the minister Evan John Roberts and the 1904-1905 Revival

Other uses
Gecko Moriah, a character in One Piece
Moriah Jerusalem Development Corporation
Poppy (entertainer) (born 1995), stage name of American singer, songwriter, actress, model, and YouTuber Moriah Rose Pereira

See also
Moira (disambiguation)
Morea (disambiguation)
Moria (disambiguation)
Morya (disambiguation)

de:Moria